In Chinese poetry, a duilian is a pair of lines of poetry which adhere to certain rules (see below). Outside of poems, they are usually seen on the sides of doors leading to people's homes or as hanging scrolls in an interior. Although often called Chinese couplet or antithetical couplet, they can better be described as a written form of counterpoint. The two lines have a one-to-one correspondence in their metrical length, and each pair of characters must have certain corresponding properties. A duilian is ideally profound yet concise, using one character per word in the style of Classical Chinese. A special, widely seen type of duilian is the chunlian, used as a New Year's decoration that expresses happiness and hopeful thoughts for the coming year.

Requirements 
A duilian must adhere to the following rules:
Both lines must have the same number of Chinese characters.
The lexical category of each character must be the same as its corresponding character.
The tone pattern of one line must be the inverse of the other.  This generally means if one character is of the level tone, its corresponding character on the other line must be of an oblique tone.
The last character of the first line should be of an oblique tone, which forces the last character of the second line to be of a level tone.
The meanings of the two lines must be related, with each pair of corresponding characters having related meanings too.

Example 
Example of a duilian:

Tone pattern: 
Pinyin: shū shān yǒu lù qín wéi  jìng
Translation: The mountain of books has one way and hard work serves as the path

Tone pattern: 
Pinyin: xué hǎi wú yá kǔ zuò zhōu
Translation: The sea of learning has no end and effort makes the boat

History and usage
Originating during the Five Dynasties, and flourishing during the Ming and Qing dynasties in particular, duilians have a history of more than a thousand years and remain an enduring aspect of Chinese culture.

Often, duilians are written on red paper and stuck on walls. Sometimes, they are carved onto plaques of wood for a more permanent display.

Dueling duilians are a popular pastime with Chinese speakers, a game of verbal and intellectual dexterity, wit, and speed which shares some parallels with the dozens.

See also
Couplet
Fai chun

Gallery

References and notes

External links 
 China the beautiful web site on duilian and chunlian
 Hubert Delahaye, "The duilian, parallel and converging sentences. A few sociological aspects", Études chinoises, vol. XXI, n° 1-2, Spring-Fall 2002 (in French with English abstract)

Chinese poetry forms
Chinese calligraphy
Arts in China